Captain Robert Neil Blair CVO RN was Private Secretary and Treasurer to The Duke of York, 1990–2001.

Blair was born in 1936, and educated at St John's College, Johannesburg, and Britannia Royal Naval College, Dartmouth. He served in the Royal Navy from 1954, and was on the RAF staff course.

From 1958 to 1959, he was on HMY Britannia. He served in various positions in the Fleet Air Arm 1961–1970, and was in command of  1965–1967.

In 1970–71, he was again on HMY Britannia. He was promoted to Commander 31 December 1971. He was Commanding Officer of the frigate  1972–1974.

From 1982 to 1985 he was Naval and Air Attaché in Athens, and Defence and Naval Attaché in The Hague 1986–1989.

He was appointed was Private Secretary and Treasurer to the Duke of York in 1990, and was also an Extra Equerry. He was Comptroller to Princess Alexandra, The Hon Lady Ogilvy 1996–1997, and Private Secretary since 1996.

He was appointed LVO in 1997, and promoted to CVO in 2001.

References
 BBC News

Commanders of the Royal Victorian Order
Royal Navy officers
British diplomats
Equerries
Graduates of Britannia Royal Naval College
Living people
Private secretaries to Prince Andrew, Duke of York
Alumni of St John's College (Johannesburg)
British expatriates in South Africa
British expatriates in Greece
Year of birth missing (living people)